Ja Ordu (also Romanized as Jā Ordū) is a village in Qilab Rural District, Alvar-e Garmsiri District, Andimeshk County, Khuzestan Province, Iran. At the 2006 census, its population was 771, in 150 families.

References 

Populated places in Andimeshk County